An Argon (also called Agon, Agrun or Parsa) is a traditional shawl-like garment worn by Hajong women in the Indian subcontinent, in modern-day India and Bangladesh.

It was a form of festive wear, worn during special occasions. Argons are shuttle-woven and characterized by large-scale, symmetrical patterns, featuring geometrical shapes and stylized leaves and flowers in colored silks and with or without gold and silver threads. Traditionally argons used to be very large in size and would have birds like herons, ducks and peacocks; and trees like kadamba tree brocaded on them. It can be worn by men during weddings or when attending religious ceremonies. Their appearance and dress resembles Boros

Gallery

See also
Pathin
Dupatta
Sabai
Hajong people

Notes

References

Sources

External links

Hajong culture
Culture of Meghalaya
Indian clothing
History of Asian clothing
Shawls and wraps
Indian shawls and wraps